The governor of Montana is the head of government of Montana and the commander-in-chief of the state's military forces. The governor has a duty to enforce state laws, the power to either approve or veto bills passed by the Montana State Legislature, to convene the legislature at any time, and to grant pardons and reprieves.

The current Montana Constitution, ratified in 1972, calls for a 4-year term for the governor, commencing on the first Monday in January following an election. The governor is term-limited to 8 years in any 16-year period. The constitution provides for the election of a lieutenant governor for the same term as the governor. The two offices are elected on the same ticket; a provision which did not appear in the state's first constitution, ratified in 1889. In the event of a vacancy in the office of governor due to resignation, disqualification, or death, the lieutenant governor becomes governor for the remainder of the term. If the governor is unable to perform his duties for any other reason, the lieutenant governor may become acting governor at the discretion of the state legislature. The 1889 constitution made the lieutenant governor president of the state senate, but this provision was removed in the 1972 constitution.

Montana has had 24 governors (ten of whom were actually born within state boundaries), consisting of 9 Republicans and 15 Democrats. The longest-serving governor was Joseph Toole, who served from 1889 to 1893 and again from 1901 until his resignation in 1908 with 11 years in office. He is the only governor to serve nonconsecutive terms. The shortest-serving governor was Elmer Holt, who served less than 13 months when the previous governor died. The current governor is Republican Greg Gianforte, who took office on January 4, 2021.

Qualifications
Anyone who seeks to be elected Governor of Montana must meet the following qualifications:
Be at least 25 years of age or older at the time of election
Be a citizen of the United States
have resided within the state at least two years at his or her election

Governors
Prior to the creation of Montana Territory (1864–1889), numerous areas of what is now Montana were areas of Oregon Territory (1848–1859), Washington Territory (1853–1863), Idaho Territory (1863–1864), and Dakota Territory (1861–1864).

Governors of the Territory of Montana
NOTE: Term dates are for the full, official term of office, see notes column for clarification of dates when men served as governor.

Governors of the State of Montana

Succession

See also
History of Montana
Territory of Montana
State of Montana
List of First Spouses of Montana

Notes

References
General

 "U.S. States L-M -- Montana." World Statesman Almanac. Retrieved August 14, 2011.
 "Former Montana Governors." State of Montana. Retrieved November 13, 2014.
 "Montana Governor Steve Bullock." State of Montana. Retrieved November 13, 2014.

Constitutions

 "Constitution of the State of Montana" (1972). Montana Legislature. Retrieved August 14, 2011.
 "Constitution of the State of Montana" (1889). University of Montana Law Library. Retrieved August 14, 2011.
 "Constitution of the State of Montana" (1884) ratified but never approved by Congress. University of Montana Law Library. Retrieved August 14, 2011.

External links

Lists of state governors of the United States
Montana Territory

Governors